Sqn Ldr Minty Agarwal is an IAF fighter controller. She was part of the team that guided India’s air defence during the 2019 India–Pakistan border skirmishes, where she witnessed a PAF F-16 Fighting Falcon being shot down. In August 2019, she was awarded the Yudh Seva Medal by President of India Ram Nath Kovind, thus becoming the first woman to receive it.

See also 
 Wing Commander Shaliza Dhami
 2019 Balakot airstrike

References 

Indian Air Force officers
Indian women aviators
Living people
Year of birth missing (living people)